Alianza Metropolitan is a bi-weekly bilingual, English and Spanish, newspaper that serves the Hispanic community in the greater metropolitan area of San Jose, California. The paper was founded in 1986 and is currently 100% Hispanic owned, by Rossana Drumond and previously by George Villalobos. The paper is edited by Gerardo Fernandez. The website of the newspaper is in Spanish. The paper's estimated circulation totals 40,000.

History

Alianza Metropolitan was founded in 1986 by George Villalobos.

In 1996, San Jose Mercury News, owned by media conglomerate Knight Ridder, established Nuevo Mundo and its Spanish-language weekly subsidiary to compete directly with the three local Hispanic-owned papers: La Ofreta, El Observador, and Alianza. Within months of its launch, Nuevo Mundo began drawing readership and advertising away from the three papers, causing financial troubles for the local papers.  In 2005 Mercury News shut down its foreign language subsidiaries including Nuevo Mundo.

Current publisher Rossana Drumond is Region VI Chair for the National Association of Hispanic Publications. In 2017, Drumond was voted "Publisher of the Year" by the NAHP.

Awards

National Association of Hispanic Publications (NAHP) José Martí Media Awards

References

Newspapers published in San Jose, California
Weekly newspapers published in California